This is a list of broadcast television stations that are licensed in the U.S. state of Missouri.

Full-power stations
VC refers to the station's PSIP virtual channel. RF refers to the station's physical RF channel.

Defunct full-power stations
 Channel 9: KMBC-TV (original) – CBS – Kansas City (August 1, 1953 – June 9, 1954, shared time with WHB-TV)
 Channel 14: KACY – St. Louis (Festus) (October 31, 1953 – April 2, 1954)
 Channel 33/15: KSPR/KGHZ – ABC – Springfield (1983–2017)
 Channel 25: KCTY – DuMont – Kansas City (June 6, 1953 – March 1, 1954)
 Channel 36: KSTM-TV – DuMont – St. Louis (October 20, 1953 – August 3, 1954)
 Channel 50: KCIT-TV (Kansas City) – Ind. – Kansas City (October 29, 1969 – July 7, 1971)

LPTV stations

Translators

External links
 
  (Directory ceased in 2017)
 Missouri Broadcasters Association
 
 
 
 
 
 

Missouri

Television stations